Eastern West Riding of Yorkshire was a parliamentary constituency covering part of the historic West Riding of Yorkshire.  It returned two Members of Parliament (MPs) to the House of Commons of the Parliament of the United Kingdom, elected by the bloc vote system.

History 

The constituency was created in 1868 when the West Riding of Yorkshire was redistributed from two divisions into three. The two-member West Riding of Yorkshire constituency had been divided for the 1865 general election into two new constituencies, each returning two members: Northern West Riding of Yorkshire and Southern West Riding of Yorkshire. The extra seats were taken from parliamentary boroughs which had been disenfranchised for corruption. In the redistribution which took effect for the 1868 general election the Eastern division was created and the Northern and Southern divisions modified. Each of the three divisions returned two members.

All three were abolished by the Redistribution of Seats Act 1885 for the 1885 general election.  The Eastern division was replaced by six new single-member constituencies: Barkston Ash, Osgoldcross, Otley, Pudsey, Ripon and Spen Valley.

Boundaries
The Reform Act 1867, as amended by the Boundary Act 1868, defined the constituency as the wapentakes of Claro, Skyrack, Barkston Ash and Osgoldcross with the part of Morley not in the Northern division. Skyrack is the wapentake centred on Leeds. The other areas included a number of small towns and the surrounding rural parishes.

Members of Parliament

Election results
Each voter had as many votes as there were seats to be filled. Before the introduction of the secret ballot, in 1872, votes had to be cast by a spoken declaration. Voting took place in public, at the hustings, which were at the place of election for the constituency which was in Leeds.

Elections in the 1880s

Elections in the 1870s

Elections in the 1860s

References

Parliamentary constituencies in Yorkshire and the Humber (historic)
Constituencies of the Parliament of the United Kingdom established in 1868
Constituencies of the Parliament of the United Kingdom disestablished in 1885
Eastern